Saint Leo the Great School is a Roman Catholic elementary school in Lancaster, Pennsylvania, United States.
It is located at
2427 Marietta Ave, Lancaster, PA 17601

Education in Lancaster, Pennsylvania
Private elementary schools in Pennsylvania